Fly Away Home ( Flying Wild and Father Goose)  is a 1996 family drama film directed by Carroll Ballard. The film stars Anna Paquin, Jeff Daniels, and Dana Delany. Fly Away Home was released on September 13, 1996, by Columbia Pictures.

Fly Away Home dramatizes the actual experiences of Bill Lishman who, in 1986, started training Canada geese to follow his ultralight aircraft, and succeeded in leading their migration in 1993 through his program "Operation Migration". The film is also based on the experience of Dr. William J. L. Sladen, a British-born zoologist and adventurer, who aided Lishman with the migration.

Plot
After surviving a car accident in which her mother Aliane dies, 13-year-old Amy Alden is brought from New Zealand to Ontario, Canada, by her estranged father Thomas Alden, a sculptor and inventor, to live with him and his girlfriend Susan.

When a construction crew destroys a small wilderness area near the Alden home, Amy finds an abandoned nest of 16 goose eggs. Without Thomas, Susan, or her uncle David knowing, she takes the eggs and keeps them in a dresser in her father's old barn to incubate. When the eggs hatch, she is allowed to keep the goslings as pets. Thomas asks for help from local Animal Regulation officer Glen Seifert on how to care for the geese. Seifert comes over to the Alden house, and explains that the geese have imprinted on Amy as their mother. He explains that geese learn everything from their parents including migratory routes, but also warns Thomas that a private ordinance dictates that all domestic geese must have their wings pinioned (clipped) to render them flightless. He promptly tries to demonstrate the process with one of the goslings, which upsets Amy. Thomas throws Seifert off his property, only for Seifert to threaten the Aldens that if the birds start flying, he will have to confiscate them.

Thomas decides to use an ultralight aircraft he had been constructing to teach the birds to fly and show them their migratory routes, but quickly realizes the birds will only follow Amy. Aided by his friend Barry, Thomas teaches Amy how to fly an ultralight aircraft of her own. David knows someone running a bird sanctuary in North Carolina, and arranges for the geese to go to the sanctuary. The birds have to arrive before November 1, or the sanctuary will be torn down by developers who plan to turn it into a coastal housing development.

Amy and Thomas practice flying the aircraft, but Igor, the weakest of the geese, who has a limp, accidentally hits the front of Amy's aircraft and lands in an isolated forest. While the group goes off to search for the bird, Glen Seifert returns to the Alden farm and confiscates the other geese. The next day, the Aldens free the geese, and Amy leads them on their migration to North Carolina.

Making an emergency landing at Niagara Falls Air Reserve Station in western New York on the south shore of Lake Ontario, Amy and Thomas almost get arrested. They become national news, with residents cheering them on.

Thomas and Amy meet an old woman with a vendetta against goose shooting, and she invites them to stay the night at her house. That night Amy asks Thomas why he seldom visited her and her mother. From her mother, she knows that her parents were artists, who tend to be selfish, and that her mother left for both of their sakes. Thomas tells her that he was afraid and angry at himself for letting them leave, so he spent the next ten years buried in his work. He apologizes to Amy.

Thirty miles before reaching the bird sanctuary, Thomas's aircraft suffers a structural failure and crashes in a cornfield; having suffered a dislocated shoulder he tells Amy to finish the journey by herself. Thomas hitchhikes to the bird sanctuary. While waiting for the geese, Thomas, Susan, David, Barry, and many animal enthusiasts stand up to developers who are waiting to start the excavation of the site.

Amy eventually appears with the geese, much to the joy of the townspeople and Amy's family, and to the dismay of the developers. The townspeople and the Aldens celebrate their victory. During the end credits, a note reveals that all 16 geese - including Igor - return to the Aldens' farm on their own in the following spring.

Cast

 Jeff Daniels as Thomas Alden
 Anna Paquin as Amy Alden
 Dana Delany as Susan Barnes
 Terry Kinney as David Alden
 Holter Graham as Barry Stickland
 Jeremy Ratchford as Glen Seifert
 Deborah Verginella as Aliane Alden
 Michael J. Reynolds as General Hatfield
 David Hemblen as Dr. Killian
 Ken James as Developer
 Nora Ballard as Jackie
 Sarena Paton as Laura
 Chris Benson as Farmer
 Gladys O'Connor as Farm Woman

Songs
"10,000 Miles" performed by Mary Chapin Carpenter
"Wherever You Are" (End titles) performed by Mary Chapin Carpenter

Production
To recreate the Alden home, principal photography took place in 1995, at two farms near Lindsay in southeastern Ontario. The township had also been the setting for A Christmas Story (1983), and later A Cool Dry Place (1998). The blacksmith shop constructed onsite for the filming of The Last Buffalo at Purple Hill, Ontario was re-used as part of the Alden homestead.

Two gliders were featured in the film: The UFM Easy Riser and the Cosmos Trike. The Easy Riser first appears as a foot-launched biplane hang glider. True to Lishman's real-life saga, modifications were made to improve the design including the addition of a motor and seat. Anna Paquin's character instead flies an A-frame Cosmos Trike with a mock goose head mounted to the noseplate of the airframe and a fabric wing covering painted to resemble feathers. The Cosmos Trike was reportedly chosen for its safety, superior engine power, and increased wing size (a feature that was needed to fly slow enough for the birds).

The four-day trip home for the geese that would take them to Lake Ontario, over the Appalachians to Pennsylvania, Maryland, finally settling on the North Carolina Shores, had principal photography actually filmed nearly entirely at Port Perry and Sandbanks Provincial Park, Ontario, Canada. Additional location shots were the city-fly-through in Toronto, Ontario, standing in for Baltimore, Maryland (CGI aircraft). At the conclusion of the production, Lishman led the 60 imprinted "actor-geese" in migration, to winter at the Tom Yawkey Wildlife Center off the coast of Georgetown, South Carolina.

While in production, the film was at first titled Flying Wild, but was changed to Fly Away Home just weeks before its release in movie theaters. The original trailer has the title Flying Wild, and can be found on certain VHS copies of Jumanji from Columbia TriStar Home Video; the French version title (L'Envolée sauvage) is the translated version of this title.

Director Carroll Ballard and cinematographer Caleb Deschanel previously collaborated on The Black Stallion and Never Cry Wolf with Fly Away Home being their third family film. Anna Paquin, who plays daughter to Jeff Daniels in Fly Away Home, would later play a love interest in The Squid and the Whale (2005). Upon the release of the Squid and the Whale, Jeff Daniels said that having had the previous experience made the filming a bit awkward for both of them.

Reception

Box office
Filmed on a modest budget, Fly Away Home returned US$25 million in the U.S. box office and US$31 million internationally.

Critical reception
Audiences and critics enjoyed the evocative, uplifting family-oriented film which also received critical acclaim. Roger Ebert noted: "There are individual shots here almost worth the price of admission...[including] a stunning shot in which the towers of Baltimore materialize from the mist, and office workers see the little girl and her geese flying past their windows." Janet Maslin from The New York Times was similarly effusive, "Mr. Ballard turns a potentially treacly children's film into an exhilarating 90's fable." Gene Shalit on the Today Show called the film "a must see movie".

The uplifting theme of the film was often cited; Frederic and Mary Ann Brussat stated, "The movie adds excitement and emotion, turning into a celebration of the creative ways human beings and animals can serve, assist, and love one another."

Fly Away Home received an 88% approval rating from Rotten Tomatoes based on 48 reviews, with an average rating of 7.30/10. The site's consensus states: "Well-acted and beautifully filmed, Fly Away Home offers heartwarming entertainment for moviegoers of all ages."

Awards
Caleb Deschanel's visuals received notice and resulted in Best Cinematography nominations for the 1996 Academy Awards and from the American Society of Cinematographers. Although unsuccessful in both competitions, Fly Away Home went on to win the 1997 Broadcast Film Critics Association Critics Choice Award as the Best Family Film, the 1997 Christopher Award (for family films), 1997 Young Artist Award in the category of Best Family Feature – Drama, and the 1997 Genesis Award for Feature Films. Anna Paquin was also nominated for the Young Artist Award for Best Performance in a Feature Film – Leading Young Actress (the film was also nominated as Best Family Feature – Drama) and the 1997 YoungStar Award for Best Performance by a Young Actress in a Drama Film.

Home media
Fly Away Home was more successful on home video than in theaters. , the studio sold an estimated $32 million on video, receiving 75% of revenue. The film was originally released to VHS in December 1996. A DVD release in July 2002, included the exclusive featurette by Bill Lishman, Operation Migration: Birds of a Feather, along with two documentaries: The Ultra Geese and the HBO special Leading the Flock. The DVD also provided a link to Lishman's "Operation Migration" website. A companion CD audio recording of the music featured in the soundtrack was released in 1996. A Blu-ray edition of Fly Away Home was released on April 7, 2009.

See also
List of American films of 1996
Imprinting (psychology)
Winged Migration

References

Notes

Bibliography

 Fly Away Home (Special Edition DVD). Culver City, California: Columbia/Tristar Home Video, 2001.
 Hermes, Patricia. Fly Away Home: The Novelization and Story Behind the Film. New York: Newmarket, 2005. .
 Lishman, Bill (as stated). Father Goose & His Goslings (Light Up the Mind of a Child Series). St. Louis, Missouri: San Val, 1992. .
 Lishman, William Alwyn. Father Goose: One Man, a Gaggle of Geese, and Their Real Life Incredible Journey South. New York: Crown, 1996. .

External links
 
 
 

1990s coming-of-age drama films
1990s teen drama films
1996 drama films
1996 films
American aviation films
American coming-of-age drama films
American teen drama films
Canadian aviation films
Canadian coming-of-age drama films
Columbia Pictures films
Coming-of-age films based on actual events
Drama films based on actual events
Films about birds
Films about families
Films about friendship
Films based on biographies
Films directed by Carroll Ballard
Films scored by Mark Isham
Films set in New Zealand
Films set in Ontario
Films set in New York (state)
Films set in Pennsylvania
Films set in Baltimore
Films set in Virginia
Films set in North Carolina
Films shot in New Zealand
Films shot in Toronto
New Zealand coming-of-age drama films
Films about father–daughter relationships
1990s English-language films
1990s American films
1990s Canadian films